Gülmira Estaibekqyzy Esimbaeva (born 23 August 1957) is a Kazakh politician who's served as the member and Deputy Chair of the Mazhilis from 2016 to 2020. She was a parliamentary leader of Nur Otan from 2016 to 2019 and member of the Supreme Soviet from 1990 until its dissolution in 1993.

Early life and education 
Esimbaeva was born the village of Usharal. In 1978 she graduated from the philological faculty of the Jambyl Pedagogical Institute, specializing in Russian language and literature.

In 1994 Esimbaeva graduated from the Al-Farabi Kazakh National University, specializing in law.

Early career 
After graduating in 1978, Esimbaeva taught Russian language, and organized of extracurricular activities at the Usharal Secondary School until 1990.

From 1993 to 2007, she served as a director of the Department, Head of the Education Department in Almaty.

Political career 
Esimbaeva was elected as the member of the Supreme Soviet of Kazakhstan in the 1990 Kazakh election. She served as a secretary and the deputy chair of the Committee for the Development of Science and Public Education until the Parliament's dissolution in December 1993. 

She became the member of the Mazhilis after being elected in the 2007 legislative election on a party list, and served as a member of the Committee for Social and Cultural Development.

After the 2016 legislative election, Esimbaeva became the deputy chair of the Mazhilis and the parliamentary leader of Nur Otan. On 22 August 2019, her role as a parliamentary leader was taken over by Mazhilis Chair Nurlan Nigmatulin.

References 

1957 births
People from Almaty Region
Soviet women in politics
20th-century Kazakhstani women politicians
21st-century Kazakhstani women politicians
Members of the Mazhilis
Living people
Al-Farabi Kazakh National University alumni
20th-century Kazakhstani politicians
21st-century Kazakhstani politicians